A traditional student is a category of students at colleges and universities.  

In the United States, it is used to refer to post-secondary students under 25 years old who enroll directly from high school, attend full-time, and do not have major life and work responsibilities (e.g., full-time job or dependents). Historically, traditional students made up the majority of students. However, these students are now a minority in the United States. It is frequently observed that traditional higher education programs and policies are geared toward, and the outcome of, the previous era when traditional students were the main market for higher education. 

Traditional students are contrasted with non-traditional students, which typically refers to adult students who are not participating in higher education immediately after high school, are 25 years old and older, and/or have major life and work roles and responsibilities.

References 

Higher education
Students in the United States